CJSC «Polet Airlines» (ZAO «Aviakompániya "Polyót"») was an airline based in Voronezh, Russia. It operated a worldwide cargo and domestic passenger charter services from Voronezh, as well as regional passenger and cargo services from Sokol. It was one of two airlines which flew the Antonov An-124 Ruslan, the world's highest gross weight cargo airplane which specialises in oversized freight. Its collapse, over lease payments for these massive aircraft, left only the Volga-Dnepr Airlines/Antonov Airlines joint partnership in this market. Its main base was Chertovitskoye Airport, Voronezh. Polet is the Russian word for flight.

History
The airline was established and started operations in 1988. In 2002 Polet began serving the agricultural, aeromedical and aerial photography markets. The airline was wholly owned by Anatoly S Karpov (Chief Executive and General Director) and had a 19.5% holding in Voronezhavia.

In December 2013, the carrier announced that it was evaluating the acquisition of five mid size jets for charter operations out of Voronezh.

Polet was sued by Alexander Lebedev, who claimed that it owned US$8 million in lease payments for An-124 aircraft.

Polet suspended both passenger and cargo operations on 24 November 2014 after which a Moscow Arbitration Court on 28 November placed the carrier into administration.

Destinations

As of October 2013, Polet Airlines operated scheduled passenger flights to the following destinations:

Europe
 Czech Republic
Prague – Prague Václav Havel Airport
 France
Châlons-en-Champagne - Châlons Vatry Airport
 Germany
Munich – Munich Airport
 Greece
Heraklion – Heraklion International Airport (Seasonal)
Rhodes – Rhodes International Airport (Seasonal)
 Latvia
Riga - Riga International Airport
 Lithuania
Vilnius - Vilnius International Airport
 Russia
Anapa – Anapa Airport
Belgorod – Belgorod International Airport
Lipetsk – Lipetsk Airport
Moscow – Domodedovo Airport
Saint Petersburg – Pulkovo Airport
Simferopol – Simferopol International Airport
Sochi – Sochi Airport
Ulyanovsk – Ulyanovsk Vostochny Airport
Voronezh – Voronezh International Airport (Hub)

Western Asia
 Armenia
Yerevan – Zvartnots International Airport
 Turkey
Antalya – Antalya Airport (Charter)
 United Arab Emirates
Dubai – Dubai International Airport (Charter)(Cargo Only)

Fleet

The Polet Airlines fleet included the following aircraft (as of December 2013):

References

External links

Polet Airlines
Polet Airlines 
Polet Cargo Airlines

Defunct airlines of Russia
Companies based in Voronezh
Airlines established in 1988
Defunct cargo airlines
1988 establishments in the Soviet Union
Airlines disestablished in 2014
2014 disestablishments in Russia